Prosorhochmus is a genus of worms belonging to the family Prosorhochmidae.

The species of this genus are found in Europe, the Americas.

Species:

Prosorhochmus adriatica 
Prosorhochmus albidus 
Prosorhochmus americanus 
Prosorhochmus belizeanus
Prosorhochmus chafarinensis 
Prosorhochmus claparedii 
Prosorhochmus nelsoni 
Prosorhochmus subterraneus 
Prosorhochmus viviparus

References

Nemerteans